Calvary is a 2014 Irish drama film written and directed by John Michael McDonagh. It stars Brendan Gleeson, Chris O'Dowd, Kelly Reilly, Aidan Gillen, Dylan Moran, Domhnall Gleeson, M. Emmet Walsh and Isaach de Bankolé. The film began production in September 2012 and was released in April 2014 in the Republic of Ireland and the United Kingdom, in July in Australia and in August 2014 in the United States.

The film was screened at the 2014 Sundance Film Festival and at the 64th Berlin International Film Festival.

Plot

In a dark Catholic confessional, an unseen man tells Father James he was horribly sexually abused as a child by a priest, promising to kill James at the beach the next Sunday (James being a good man whose death will hurt the Church more than would the death of an abusive priest). James has a week to arrange his affairs. His bishop leaves it to James to decide whether to notify the police.

James' daughter Fiona has attempted suicide after feeling abandoned following her mother's death and her father's entry into the priesthood. Their reconciliation is a principal theme of the film.

Local butcher Jack Brennan has hit his unfaithful wife, Veronica, and James confronts him. Jack denies it, blaming Veronica's lover, Simon. James goes about his pastoral duties, and obtains a revolver for an elderly American writer who is contemplating suicide to thwart senile decay.

Millionaire Michael Fitzgerald's family has deserted him and he feels directionless and detached from reality. Father James visits him at his mansion, and after a short time comes to believe Michael only invited him to make fun of him. Michael in a drunken display of irreverence takes one of the paintings in his collection, The Ambassadors, and urinates on it, claiming it means nothing to him. At the hospital, following a car crash, James performs the last rites for the Italian driver, and comforts the widow, Teresa. She bravely accepts her husband's death, believing life with love lost better than life without knowing love. James visits Freddie Joyce in jail, a killer who ate his female victims and now, asking for forgiveness, cannot recall where one particular victim is buried. James initially accuses him of insincerity, but later remarks that if God cannot understand Freddie, nobody can. Through James's dealings with Freddie, Michael, another potential suicide (Milo), Teresa, and Fiona, the film reflects on guilt, sin, virtue, depression and suicide.

That night, James witnesses the burning down of his church. He later tells Fiona he will never abandon her, spiritually at least, and she reciprocates. Finding his dog dead with its throat cut, he buries it, weeping, but keeps the death from his daughter the next morning as she leaves. Walking a country lane, James chats innocently with a young girl when the father drives up, orders her away from him and rudely questions his motives. At the pub, the doctor/pathologist tells James a horrifying story about a small child rendered deaf, mute, paralyzed and blind after botched anaesthesia, and contemplates the ineffable terror of such sensory isolation. James, angered, gets drunk, argues with cynical publican Brendan Lynch and empties the revolver into the furnishings.

Brendan wields a baseball bat and later, a beaten-up James is recovering at home. He violently berates his house guest Father Leary who, offended, leaves the next morning. James decides to fly to Dublin, but returns from the airport after meeting Teresa and seeing her husband's coffin disrespected by the airport staff. Heading to the beach on the fateful Sunday, James chats with the ageing writer en route, then by phone to Fiona, saying sin is considered too much and virtue not enough. He stresses the importance of forgiveness and they forgive one another.

After James throws his revolver into the sea, a distressed Michael walks up and James promises to visit him. Later, the altar boy, painting a seascape at the top of the beach, witnesses James waiting on the beach as Jack Brennan strides along the shore towards James, a revolver outstretched. Jack confesses to the arson and to hitting Veronica but denies killing the dog. Jack, hearing that James shed tears over his dog, asks if he cried similarly over news reports concerning children abused by priests. James says no, he had felt detached from such stories—whereupon the enraged Jack shoots James in the side. The boy runs towards them but James shouts at him to flee. Jack says it is too late to stop, telling James to say his prayers. When James says he already has, Jack delivers a mortal shot to the priest's head.

In brief tableaux, we see the parishioners and Teresa going about their quotidian lives. The final scene ends as Fiona visits Jack in prison, each tentatively picking up a telephone handset to talk across the intervening glass panel. No words are spoken before the film cuts to credits.

Cast

 Brendan Gleeson as Father James 
 Chris O'Dowd as Jack Brennan
 Kelly Reilly as Fiona 
 Aidan Gillen as Dr. Frank Harte
 Dylan Moran as Michael Fitzgerald 
 Isaach de Bankolé as Simon
 M. Emmet Walsh as The Writer, Gerald Ryan
 Marie-Josée Croze as Teresa
 Domhnall Gleeson as Freddie Joyce
 David Wilmot as Father Leary 
 Pat Shortt as Brendan Lynch
 Gary Lydon as Inspector Stanton
 Killian Scott as Milo Herlihy
 Orla O'Rourke as Veronica Brennan
 Owen Sharpe as Leo
 David McSavage as Bishop Garret Montgomery

Production

Development
McDonagh conceived the idea for Calvary and wrote the screenplay while filming The Guard with Gleeson in late 2009. McDonagh explained the intentions he had for the film: "There are probably films in development about priests which involve abuse. My remit is to do the opposite of what other people do, and I wanted to make a film about a good priest." He elaborates that it is tonally "in the same darkly comedic vein as The Guard, but with a much more serious and dramatic narrative." Gleeson's casting was announced in October 2011. The casting of Chris O'Dowd, Kelly Reilly and Aidan Gillen was announced in February 2012, while further casting was announced in August 2012.

Principal photography
Filming began on 24 September 2012. The production spent three weeks shooting in and around County Sligo primarily in the town of Easkey where the film is set and also on the Streedagh beach in north county Sligo, with some shooting in Ardgillan Castle Balbriggan Dublin followed by two weeks of filming in Rush, Dublin.

Reception

Box office
Calvary had its world premiere at the 2014 Sundance Film Festival. Fox Searchlight secured distribution rights for the US and select international territories. Calvary made its European premiere at the 64th Berlin International Film Festival and its Irish premiere as the gala opening of the Jameson Dublin International Film Festival on 13 February 2014. The film earned $16.9 million worldwide.

Critical response

Calvary received positive reviews from critics and has a "certified fresh" score of 90% on Rotten Tomatoes based on 158 reviews with an average rating of 7.6/10. The critical consensus states "Led by a brilliant performance from Brendan Gleeson, Calvary tackles weighty issues with humour, intelligence, and sensitivity." On Metacritic, the film has a score of 77 out of 100, based on 42 critics, indicating "generally favourable reviews".

Justin Chang of Variety magazine praised Gleeson for his soulful performance, called the film a "masterful follow-up to The Guard", and predicted near-certain critical plaudits at a distinguished arthouse reception for the film.
Tim Griersen of Screen International also praised Gleeson for his performance and the film, calling it "A rich character drama that's equally eloquent and despairing, Calvary carries a weary resignation that feels lived-in and deeply considered." He cautions that the film might prove to be a hard sell as it examines religious faith and does not fit in an easily marketable genre.
Xan Brooks of The Guardian comments on the self-referential nature of the film, and also calls the film "terrific (at least until the denouement, when it rather strains for grandeur)". Brooks gives the film 4/5.

Praising Calvary for its treatment of its weighty thematic elements, Lauren Ely for First Things wrote: "Is it possible for a film to capture the horror of the sexual abuse scandal in the Catholic Church while at the same time presenting a case for the necessity of the institutional priesthood? Against all odds, this is exactly what Irish director John Michael McDonagh's Calvary manages to do."
In his review, the cultural commentator and Catholic bishop Robert Barron writes that the film "shows, with extraordinary vividness, what authentic spiritual shepherding looks like and how it feels for a priest to have a shepherd's heart."

Xan Brooks in The Guardian compared it to a mysterious and surreal retelling of the Passion.

Awards

References

External links

 
 
 
 

2014 drama films
2014 films
English-language Irish films
County Sligo in fiction
Entertainment One films
Films about Catholic priests
Films about child sexual abuse
Films about pedophilia
Films critical of the Catholic Church
Films directed by John Michael McDonagh
2014 independent films
Films set in Ireland
Films shot in the Republic of Ireland
Irish drama films
2010s English-language films